Senja is an island and future municipality in Troms county, Norway.

Senja may also refer to:
Senja LRT station, an LRT station on the Bukit Panjang LRT line in Singapore
FK Senja, a Norwegian association football club
Senja, a given name related to Xenia

People with the given name
Senja Pusula (born 1941), a former cross-country skier from Finland

See also
Senja prosti, a deanery in the Church of Norway in Troms county, Norway
Senja Troll, a tourist attraction in Finnsæter on the island of Senja in northern Norway